Quercus disciformis is a species of tree in the beech family. It has been found only in southern China, in the Provinces of Guangdong, Guangxi, Guizhou, Hainan, and Hunan. It is placed in subgenus Cerris, section Cyclobalanopsis.

Quercus disciformis is a tree up to 14 meters tall with leaves as much as 14 cm long.

References

External links
line drawing, Flora of China Illustrations vol. 4, figure 392, drawings 5-9 at bottom

disciformis
Flora of China
Plants described in 1947